Robert Edward Jackson (born April 1, 1953) is a former American football guard who played 11 professional seasons with the National Football League's Cleveland Browns. Jackson attended Duke University, where he arrived as a quarterback (a position he played at North Mecklenburg High School) with his twin brother Ken, a tight end.  Robert filled out over his time at Duke, eventually landing on the offensive line.  From a humble start as a free agent, Robert was honored as a Cleveland Browns Legend in September 2014.

Robert started working in the insurance business in the offseason during his playing career.  He and Doug Dieken eventually formed Jackson Dieken and Associates in Westlake, Ohio, where Robert serves as principal.

References

External links
 NFL.com player page

1953 births
Living people
American football offensive guards
Cleveland Browns players
Duke Blue Devils football players
Players of American football from Charlotte, North Carolina